Martijn Bok (born 8 March 1973) is a retired Dutch tennis player.

Bok has a career high ATP singles ranking of 212 achieved on 22 May 1995. He also has a career high doubles ranking of 204 achieved on 16 October 1995.

Bok has won 1 ATP Challenger doubles title at the 1995 Seville Challenger.

Bok is the current coach of Petra Martić, tennis professional from Croatia.

Tour titles

Doubles

References

External links
 
 

1973 births
Living people
Dutch male tennis players
People from Best, Netherlands
People from Vught
Sportspeople from North Brabant